Tirdadh was the first king of the Gilites, ruling during an unknown date between the 9th and 10th-century. He was succeeded by Lili ibn al-Nu'man. Tirdadh had a son named Harusindan, who would later succeed Lili ibn al-Nu'man as the new ruler of the Gilites.

Sources 
 

10th-century deaths
10th-century Iranian people
Year of birth unknown
Gilaki people